Bubble Houses may refer to:

 Bubble Houses (Hobe Sound, Florida)
 Bubble Houses (Litchfield Park, Arizona)
 Palais Bulles (Bubble Palace or Bubble House), a large house in Théoule-sur-Mer, France